Allsvenskan 1992, part of the 1992 Swedish football season, was the 68th Allsvenskan season played. IFK Norrköping won the league ahead of runners-up Östers IF, and advanced to Mästerskapsserien 1992 along with the teams placed 3 to 6, while the teams placed 7 to 10 advanced to Kvalsvenskan 1992.

Spring 1992

League table

Results

Autumn 1992

Mästerskapsserien 1992

Results

Kvalsvenskan 1992

Allsvenskan qualification play-offs 1992 
1st round

2nd round

Promotions, relegations and qualifications

Season statistics

Top scorers

References 

Print

Online

Notes 

Allsvenskan seasons
Swed
Swed
1